Wardenburg is a municipality in the district of Oldenburg, in Lower Saxony, Germany. It is situated on the river Hunte, approx. 8 km south of Oldenburg.

References

Oldenburg (district)